Horithyatira ornata is a moth in the family Drepanidae. It is found in Indonesia (Java).

References

Moths described in 1944
Thyatirinae
Moths of Indonesia